The 21st Finswimming World Championships were held in Tomsk, Russia at the Aquatics Centre Zvezdniy from 5 to 8 July 2021.

Medal overview

Men's events

 Swimmers who participated in the heats only and received medals.

Women's events

 Swimmers who participated in the heats only and received medals.

Mixed events

 Swimmers who participated in the heats only and received medals.

Medal table

References

External links
Official website
Results

Finswimming World Championships
Finswimming World Championships
Sport in Tomsk
Finswimming World Championships